Ečka is a village located in the Zrenjanin municipality, in the Central Banat District of Serbia. It is situated in the autonomous province of Vojvodina.

Name and history
In Serbian, the village is known as Ečka (Ечка), in Romanian as Ecica or Ecica Română, in German as Deutsch-Etschka, and in Hungarian as Écska (until 1899: Német-Écska).

The village was merged with former settlement known as Mala Ečka (Мала Ечка) in Serbian, Alt Etschka in German, and Román-Écska or Olahécska in Hungarian.

Ethnic groups (2002 census)
The village has a Serb ethnic majority and its population numbering 4,513 people (2002 census).

Serbs = 2,483 (55.02%)
Romanians = 1,325 (29.36%)
Hungarians = 196 (4.34%)
Yugoslavs = 123 (2.73%)
Romani = 72 (1.60%)

Historical population
1900: 4,892
1931: 5,207
1948: 3,934
1953: 4,188
1961: 4,323
1971: 4,621
1981: 5,293
1991: 5,172

Trivia 
Franz Liszt played piano at Kaštel castle as a nine-year-old boy.

See also
List of places in Serbia
List of cities, towns and villages in Vojvodina

References
Slobodan Ćurčić, Broj stanovnika Vojvodine, Novi Sad, 1996.

External links
 About Ečka (ADF/USAID)

Additional pictures

Populated places in Serbian Banat
Zrenjanin